"Shine It All Around" is the first single from Robert Plant and the Strange Sensation, from the album Mighty ReArranger.

Reception
The single peaked at #18 on Billboard's Mainstream Rock Songs. World Cafes David Dye called the track a "favorite". In 2017, Stereogum named it the best song of Plant's solo career. The recording was nominated for the Grammy Award for Best Solo Rock Vocal Performance, losing in the 48th Annual Grammy Awards to Bruce Springsteen's "Devils & Dust".

"All the Money in the World" 
The B-side "All the Money in the World", and was the only non-album song to emerge from the sessions aside from remixes.

Track listing

CD 1
"Shine It All Around"
"All the Money in the World"

CD 2
"Shine It All Around"
"Shine It All Around" (The Girls Remix)
"Shine It All Around" (U-MYX format)

7" single
"Shine It All Around"
"All the Money in the World"

12" single
"Shine It All Around"
"Tin Pan Valley" (The Girls Remix)

References

2005 singles
2005 songs
Atlantic Records singles
Robert Plant and the Strange Sensation songs
Sanctuary Records singles
Songs written by Justin Adams
Songs written by Liam Tyson
Songs written by Robert Plant